Harlem shake may refer to:

 Harlem shake (dance), a dance originating in Harlem, US, in 1981
 "Harlem Shake" (song), a 2012 song by American record producer Baauer
 Harlem Shake (meme), an Internet meme from the song, which began in early 2013
 Harlem Shakes, an American indie rock band

See also
 Harlem Shuffle (disambiguation)